Scroogenomics is a non-fiction book written by the economist Joel Waldfogel.

Overview
In his book Waldfogel argues that purchasing gifts for other people is a "terrible way to allocate resources" as a result of gift givers' lack of knowledge of the recipients' true preferences.  Waldfogel estimates that approximately $12 billion a year in the U.S. and $25 billion a year worldwide is misallocated in Yuletide giftgiving, which he calls "an orgy of wealth destruction".

See also
 The Tyranny of the Market – also written by Waldfogel

References

External links
 Cowie, Ian – "Scroogenomics: three in four say they will not buy Christmas presents this year" The Telegraph. 11 Dec 2012
 Langer, Ellen – "Scroogenomics: Are the Grinches Wrong?" The Huffington Post. 28 Dec 2009
 Muir, David – "Scroogenomics: Your Loved Ones May Not Love Their Christmas Gifts" ABC News. 12 Dec 2009
 Sachs, Andrea – "Why We Shouldn't Give Christmas Gifts" Time Magazine. 12 Nov 2009
 Will, George – "George F. Will on the disaster of Christmas giving" The Washington Post. 26 Nov 2009
 

Economics books
Princeton University Press books